WWKI (100.5 FM) is a commercial radio station in Kokomo, Indiana.  It is owned by Cumulus Media and it broadcasts a country radio format, calling itself 100.5 KI.  The studios are at 519 N. Main St. in downtown Kokomo.  

WWKI has an effective radiated power (ERP) of 50,000 watts, the current maximum in most of Indiana.  The transmitter is on East County Road 200 South near the Kokomo Creek.

History
On , the station first signed on the air.  Its original call sign was WFKO, which stood for the name of the owner, Fidelity Broadcasting, and its city of license, KOkomo, Indiana.  WFKO had a female program director, Patricia Sweeney, unusual in that era.  The power was only 1,600 watts, a fraction of its current output.  It also was unusual in being a stand-alone FM station.  Most FM stations in the early days were co-owned with an AM station.

In 1968, the station was acquired by BGS Broadcasting, which changed its call letters to the current WWKI.  The station has played country music for nearly its entire history.

Slogans
 North Central Indiana's Most Listened-To Station
 Hit Country 100.5 KI

WWKI Shows
 Tammy Lively (Weekdays 5 AM to 9:30 AM)
 Male Call (Weekdays: 9:30 to 10:30 AM)
 JR Dennis (Weekdays: 10:30 AM to 3 PM)
 Nick Livingston (Weekdays: 3 to 7 PM)
 Nights With Elaina (nationally syndicated - 7 PM to 12 AM)
 Later with Lia (nationally syndicated - 12 AM to 5 AM)
 Kenny Beasley (Saturday: 9 AM to 4 PM)
 The Classic Country Show with Chris Allen (Saturday: 4 PM to 7 PM)
 Country Countdown USA with Lon Helton (Sunday: 9 AM to 1 PM)
 Josh Norfleet (Sunday: 1 PM to 7 PM)

References

External links

WKI
Cumulus Media radio stations